Southern Front may refer to:

 Southern Front (RSFSR), a formation of the Red Army during the Russian Civil War (1918–20)
 Southern Front (Soviet Union), a formation of the Soviet Red Army in World War II
 Southern Front (Sudan), a Sudanese political party
 Southern Front (Syrian rebel group)
 Polish Southern Front, a formation of the Polish Army during the Invasion of Poland of 1939
 Franco-Turkish War, 1918–21 war during the Turkish War of Independence
 Italian campaign (World War II), 1943–45